Angono National High School is a high school in Angono, Rizal, Philippines established in 1980. This school later on hailed as the most prestigious high school in Rizal, as of 2020.

References

Education in Angono, Rizal
High schools in Rizal
1980 establishments in the Philippines
Educational institutions established in 1980